Westdijk is a Dutch surname. Notable people with the surname include: 

 Berend Westdijk (born 1985), Dutch cricketer
 Robert Jan Westdijk (born 1964), Dutch film director

Dutch-language surnames